Plotava is a rural locality and the administrative center of Plotavsky Selsoviet Rural Settlement, Oktyabrsky District, Kursk Oblast, Russia. Population:

Geography 
The village is located on the Vorobzha River (a left tributary of the Seym River), 64 km from the Russia–Ukraine border, 25 km south-west of Kursk, 13 km south of the district center – the urban-type settlement Pryamitsyno.

 Climate
Plotava has a warm-summer humid continental climate (Dfb in the Köppen climate classification).

Transport 
Plotava is located 9.5 km from the federal route  Crimea Highway (a part of the European route ), 3.5 km from the road of regional importance  ("Crimea Highway" – Ivanino, part of the European route ), 6 km from the road  (Dyakonovo – Sudzha – border with Ukraine), on the road of intermunicipal significance  (38K-004 – Plotava), 12 km from the nearest railway halt 439 km (railway line Lgov I — Kursk).

The rural locality is situated 35 km from Kursk Vostochny Airport, 108 km from Belgorod International Airport and 231 km from Voronezh Peter the Great Airport.

References

Notes

Sources

Rural localities in Oktyabrsky District, Kursk Oblast